Al-Khirniq bint Badr ibn Hiffān (or Haffān, d. perhaps c. 600) was an early Arabic elegiac poet. She was half-sister or aunt to the poet Tarafa ibn al'Abd.

Al-Khirniq's surviving diwan extends to somewhat under sixty lines, mostly preserved in the work of Abu 'Amr ibn al-'Ala'. Her known elegies are addressed to relatives, including her brother and her husband Bishr ibn 'Amr, who was slain by neighboring tribe on Mount Qudab.

References

Medieval women poets
Arabic-language women poets
6th-century Arabic poets
6th-century women writers